Olivier Doré is a cosmologist, who is currently working as research scientist in Jet Propulsion Laboratory and visiting associate faculty at the California Institute of Technology.

Awards
 Breakthrough Prize in Fundamental Physics, December 2017
 UC Irvine, Distinguished Visiting Professor, 2017, date 
 Laboratoire d’Astrophysique de Marseille (LAM), Aix-Marseille Universit´e, France, Visiting Professor, 2017, 1 month
 JPL Voyager award, May 2016
 JPL Team award for outstanding contribution to the SPHEREx Proposal Team, February 2015
 JPL Mariner award, May 2013
 Gruber 2012 Cosmology Prize awarded to Charles Bennett and the WMAP team
 NASA Group Achievement Award (as a member of the NASA Planck satellite science team), May 2009, May 2010, September 2014
 NASA Group Achievement Award (as a member of the NASA WMAP satellite science team), May 2007
 Fellow of the Société de secours des amis des sciences,

References

External links 
 Personal webpage
 CV
 Scholar google

Year of birth missing (living people)
Living people
French cosmologists
Alumni of the University of Cambridge
21st-century French physicists